Brian Jack (born February 17, 1988) is an American political consultant and who served as White House Director of Political Affairs under President Donald Trump from 2019 to 2021. He is currently a senior advisor on Trump's 2024 presidential campaign.

During the 2016 Republican primary, Jack worked on Ben Carson's presidential campaign before joining Trump's campaign. After Trump was elected, Jack worked in the presidential transition of Donald Trump. 

Earlier in his career, Jack worked at the Republican National Committee (RNC) and the American Israel Public Affairs Committee (AIPAC).

Education

Born in Atlanta on February 17, 1988, Jack graduated from Woodward Academy in College Park, Georgia in 2006. In 2010, Jack graduated from Pepperdine University in Malibu, California.

Career
Jack worked at the Republican National Committee (RNC) and the American Israel Public Affairs Committee (AIPAC), a pro-Israel nonprofit organization. At AIPAC, Jack was a political analyst who liaised with candidates for Congress.

2016 presidential election

Jack left AIPAC to work for Ben Carson's 2016 presidential campaign, where he managed the nationwide volunteer effort to qualify Carson for Republican presidential primary ballots.  Later, Jack also coordinated Carson’s campaign in the Southeastern states. On March 11, 2016, Jack joined Donald Trump’s 2016 presidential campaign as its national delegate director.

At the 2016 Republican National Convention, Jack led the efforts to combat the Never Trump movement.  Following the Convention, Jack coordinated Trump’s campaign in Georgia and Florida. Following Trump’s election, Jack worked in the presidential transition, recommending personnel appointments for the incoming Administration.

Trump Administration 

On January 20, 2017, Jack was appointed Special Assistant to the President and Deputy White House Political Director by President Trump. Following the 2018 midterm elections, Jack was appointed White House Director of Political Affairs on February 2, 2019.

On September 13, 2020, Jack was promoted to Assistant to the President, the highest rank of Executive Office of the President staff. Shortly after Election Day 2020, Jack contracted COVID-19 amid the White House COVID-19 outbreak.

2024 presidential election 
In 2022, Jack joined Donald Trump's 2024 presidential campaign as a senior advisor. Alongside Susie Wiles and Chris LaCivita, Jack has been identified as one of the "top campaign aides" on Trump's team.

References

1988 births
Georgia (U.S. state) Republicans
Living people
Pepperdine University alumni
Politicians from Atlanta
Woodward Academy alumni
Donald Trump 2016 presidential campaign
Trump administration personnel
Donald Trump 2024 presidential campaign
American political consultants